Tokyo's 12th district is a single-member constituency of the House of Representatives, the lower house of the national Diet of Japan.

It has been held by Mitsunari Okamoto of Komeito since 2021.

Members

References 

1994 establishments in Japan
Constituencies established in 1994
Districts of the House of Representatives (Japan)
Politics of Tokyo